Bara Gumbad is a medieval monument located in Lodhi Gardens in Delhi, India. It is part of a group of monuments that include a Friday mosque (Jama Masjid) and the "mehman khana" (guest house) of Sikandar Lodhi, the ruler of the Delhi Sultanate. The Bara Gumbad was constructed in 1490 CE, during the reign of the Lodhi dynasty. Its construction is generally attributed to Sikandar Lodhi, and it is believed to have the earliest constructed full dome of any building in Delhi.

The monument is situated near the Tomb of Sikandar Lodhi and Shisha Gumbad. Although the three structures, which share a common raised platform, were all built during the Lodhi reign, they were not constructed at the same time. The intended purpose of the builders of Bara Gumbad is unclear: it may have been intended as a free-standing tomb, but no tombstone has been identified, or as a gateway. The area in which Bara Gumbad is situated was formally called Khairpur village.

History

Bada Gumbad was constructed in 1490 CE, and is believed to have the earliest constructed full dome of any building in Delhi. Its construction is generally attributed to Sikandar Lodhi. A mihrab (prayer niche) in the Friday mosque (Jama Masjid) of the Bara Gumbad gives the date of construction as 900 AH (Anno Hegirae) of the Islamic lunar calendar.

Including the bada gumbad  there are four monuments in the Lodhi Gardens; the other three being Tomb of Sikandar Lodhi, Shisha Gumbad and the tomb of Muhammad Shah (who belonged to the Sayyid dynasty). During the rule of Sikander Lodhi, the Bara Gumbad, the adjacent mosque and the "mehman khana" (guest house) were constructed. The Bara Gumbad is speculated to serve as a gateway to the Friday mosque. However owing to the constitutions date, placement and stylistic differences the theory of gateway is not supported. The purpose and significance of the Bara Gumbad is unknown and to date remains a mystery. The Friday mosque was constructed in 1494 CE. It was the first mosque to be built in a style that first appeared during the Lodhi Dynasty.

Some historians suggest that the Bara Gumbad was built by an unidentified noble in 1490 CE, before being appropriated by Sikander Lodhi in 1494 CE, to provide an entryway to his mosque. 

Simon Digby argued, that the Bara Gumbad served as a gateway to a large walled enclosure, which included the Shisha Gumbad, identified by the same scholar as the tomb of Bahlul Lodi.

Initially, all the monuments were built independently, and were not in one confine. In the early twentieth century, a park was developed, bringing the four monuments in one confine. The park was inaugurated on 9 April 1936 by Lady Willingdon, the wife of Viceroy Lord Willingdon. The park was originally called the Lady Willingdon Park after her, but was renamed to Lodhi Gardens after independence of India in 1947.

Construction and architecture

It is speculated that the Bara Gumbad was constructed to provide a gateway to the nearby mosque or a large walled enclosure. Although the structure does not house any tomb, there is a platform in the central courtyard that suggests the structure to be a burial place. The purpose Bara Gumbad is unknown. Bara Gumbad is grouped together with a mosque and "mehman khana" which is a smaller structure with five bays.

Three out of five bays in the mosque have domes whereas the remaining two have vaulted roofs (on mosque and "mehman khana"). The central bays feature low domes, while the end-bays feature flat roofs. There are oriel windows to the north and south. Both the oriel windows and the tapering minarets appear to anticipate later architectural styles.

The Bara Gumbad is square type construction which sits on a plinth. The mosque measures  on each side. At the rear, the corners and sides of the mosque feature tall tapering semi-circular minars. The east, south, and west are decorated, and feature ogee arch openings, which are set into rectangular frames. The architecture combines bracket and lintel beams, blending Islamic and Hindu architectures.

Like the Shisha Gumbad, the Bara Gumbad is also a single story structure but has an external semblance of spanning in two floors when viewed from outside.

The dome, the mosque and the "mehman khana" are constructed of red, grey and black stone, including grey quartzite and red sandstone. The interior is elaborately ornamented with painted stucco. Colored tiles, incised carvings, and painted plaster on the mosque are decorated with foliage, flowers, geometric patterns, and Quranic inscriptions.

Location

The Bara Gumbad is located in and is a part of the Lodhi Gardens in Delhi, India. The village where the monument stands was earlier called Khairpur. The garden is bounded by Amrita Shergill Marg in the west, northwest and north, Max MuellerMarg on the east and Lodhi Road on the south side. Safdarjang Tomb is situated on southwest corner of the Lodhi Garden.

Gallery

See also
 List of Monuments of National Importance in Delhi

References

External links
 

Architecture of the Lodi dynasty
Monuments of National Importance in Delhi
Mosque architecture
Mosques in Delhi
Sandstone buildings in India
Buildings and structures completed in 1490